Claude Jacquand, known as Claudius (11 December 1803, Lyon – 2 April 1878, Paris) was a French painter of historical tableaus, genre scenes and religious subjects.

Biography 
He came from a family devoted to handicrafts and his father was a comb-maker. He had his first art lessons at the École nationale des beaux-arts de Lyon with Fleury François Richard. Following his mother's death in 1836, he moved to Paris and began exhibiting.

In 1839, he became a Knight in the Legion d'Honneur and, a year later, he was awarded the Gold Medal at an exposition in Brussels. The following year, at an exhibition in The Hague, he won another Gold Medal and was decorated with the Order of Leopold. His father died shortly after, leaving him several valuable properties that enabled him to marry the aristocratic Lydia de Forbin, daughter of Louis Nicolas Philippe Auguste de Forbin and widow of the Viscount Alexandre Paul de Pinelli. He taught painting to his son-in-law , who also became a well-known artist.

He and his family settled at her hometown of Émeringes, where he built a mansion inspired by a castle he had seen in Paris. He was chosen to be Mayor in 1844. A year later, he exhibited at the Salon, where Charles Baudelaire characterized him as a painter of the "twentieth quality".

After the French Revolution of 1848, his income began to shrink dramatically and he sought paid employment. An effort to obtain the post of Director at the Musée de l'Histoire de France at Versailles was not successful. He and Lydia moved to Boulogne-sur-Mer in 1852 and sold their properties in Émeringes to help maintain their life style. Nevertheless, in 1856, they were forced to seek less expensive quarters in Paris. Lydia died in 1863, amid worsening financial problems. He continued to exhibit regularly, earning merely enough to get by. He died in 1878.

Selected paintings

References

Further reading 
 Dominique Lobstein, Claudius Jacquand: les derniers moments de Christophe Colomb, Somogy Éditions d'Art 2011 
 Dominique Richard, Biographie et catalogue raisonné de l’œuvre peint de Claudius Jacquand, Université Lyon II 1980

External links 

 ArtNet: More works by Jacquand

1803 births
1878 deaths
French history painters
Artists from Lyon
19th-century French painters